Eileen Kampakuta Brown  (born 1 January 1938) is an Aboriginal elder from Australia. She was awarded the Goldman Environmental Prize in 2003 together with Eileen Wani Wingfield, for their efforts to stop governmental plans for a nuclear waste dump in South Australia's desert land, and for protection of their land and culture.

Brown, Wingfield and other elder women formed the Cooper Pedy Women's Council (Kupa Piti Kungka Tjuta) in 1995.

As a child Brown often had to hide from government officials, who had a policy of removing biracial children from their families and sending them to institutions. In 2000 she and Eileen Wani Wingfield published Down the Hole, a children's book based on their experiences of hiding from the authorities.

References

Australian environmentalists
Australian women environmentalists
Australian indigenous rights activists
Women human rights activists
Living people
Australian anti-uranium activists
1938 births
Goldman Environmental Prize awardees